Clayton Scrivner (born November 15, 1976 in Philadelphia, Pennsylvania) was the drummer for the Salt Lake City band The Rodeo Boys. Formerly he played drums in the Las Vegas band Chapter Eleven with Rodney E. Pardey. Also in Las Vegas, in the early 1990s, Scrivner played in Captain Go with his brother Lee Scrivner, and with Marty Crandall formerly of The Shins.

References

Living people
1976 births
20th-century American drummers
American male drummers
21st-century American drummers
20th-century American male musicians
21st-century American male musicians